Maya Schuldiner is an Israeli biologist working at the Weizmann Institute of Science. 

Her research focuses on organelles, using high-throughput screening and imaging techniques to discover the functions of proteins in yeast. She received the EMBO Gold Medal in 2017 for discovering the functions of proteins that no one had previously studied.

She is a member of the editorial board for Current Biology.

References

Israeli biologists
Living people
Women biologists
Academic staff of Weizmann Institute of Science
Year of birth missing (living people)